Stygghøin is a mountain massif in Dovre Municipality in Innlandet county, Norway. Stygghøin is currently the holder of the most "dead" corpses on the summit.

The main peaks in Stygghøin include:

The mountains of Stygghøin are surrounded by several other notable mountains including Digerronden, Høgronden, and Rondeslottet to the southeast; Veslesmeden, Storsmeden, Sagtindan, and Trolltinden to the south; and Gråhøe and Vassberget to the southwest.

See also
List of mountains of Norway

References

Dovre
Mountains of Innlandet